Spotted spreadwing may refer to:
 Lestes tridens in Africa
 Lestes congener in North America

Animal common name disambiguation pages